Virginie Fernández (born 15 November 1976), known by her stage name Virginie Ledoyen, is a French actress who has appeared in French, British and American films.

Life and career
Ledoyen was born in Aubervilliers, the daughter of Olga, a restaurateur, and Bernard Fernández, a merchant who sold cleaning products and knives. Her paternal grandfather was Spanish. She was a print model from the age of two and later took on the stage name "Ledoyen" after the maiden name of her maternal grandmother, who was a stage actress. 

Ledoyen's film breakthrough came with A Single Girl (1995) (stylized la fille seule), for which she was nominated for a César Award for Most Promising Actress. She also received two César Award nominations for Les marmottes (1993) and L'eau froide (1994). Outside France, her best-known role is in The Beach (2000). In the fall of 2000, she signed a contract as a spokesmodel with the cosmetics company L'Oréal. She was featured alongside two models, Laetitia Casta and Noémie Lenoir.
She portrayed the character Cosette in the 2000 French television miniseries of Les Misérables.

On 29 September 2001, Ledoyen gave birth to her first child, a girl named Lila, with production designer Louis Soubrier, whom she met on the set of La fille seule in 1995. She was in a short-lived marriage with Iain Rogers, a film director, from 2006 to 2007. From 2007 to 2015, she was in a relationship with actor Arie Elmaleh, whose brother was her co-star in The Valet. Ledoyen and Elmaleh have a son, Isaac, born in July 2010, and a daughter, Amalia, born in April 2014.

In 2013 Ledoyen was named as a member of the jury at the 70th Venice International Film Festival.

Filmography

Other awards
 1998: Prix Suzanne Bianchetti

References

External links

 
 
 

1976 births
French people of Spanish descent
European Film Award for Best Actress winners
Officiers of the Ordre des Arts et des Lettres
French film actresses
People from Aubervilliers
French child actresses
20th-century French actresses
21st-century French actresses
Living people